Gymnastics events at the 2007 Games of the Small States of Europe were held in Monaco.

Medalists

Artistic gymnastics

Men

Women

References

2007 in gymnastics
Gymnastics at the Games of the Small States of Europe
International gymnastics competitions hosted by Monaco